Kuji (fl. 4th century BC) was a ruler and eristavi of Colchis. During his reign his castle of Nokalakevi was built. Kuji aided Pharnavaz I of Iberia against the tyrannical ruler Azo. Pharnavaz subsequently deposed and killed Azo and Kuji recognized his authority giving him the Colchian throne.

According to The Georgian Chronicles:

Kuji eventually married Pharnavaz's sister. This marriage would produce the progeny of Kartam of Colchis.

References

Bibliography
Georgian Chronicles, Life of Kartli, chronicle

Kings of Colchis
4th-century BC rulers
3rd-century BC rulers